Erilusa leucoplagalis is a moth in the family Crambidae. It was described by George Hampson in 1899. It is found in Mexico (Veracruz, Xalapa), Costa Rica and Cuba.

References

Moths described in 1899
Spilomelinae